P.A.O. Kalyvion Football Club (Παναθηναϊκός Αθλητικός Όμιλος Καλυβίων; Panathinaikos Athlitikos Omilos Kalyvion), is a Greek football club, based at Kalyvia Thorikou. The club was founded in 1979.

Players

Current squad

Personnel

Current Board

|}

References

External links

Official Website
PAO Kalivion FC

Other Websites
Facebook webpage 

Association football clubs established in 1979
Football clubs in Athens
1979 establishments in Greece
Football clubs in Attica